Sisters on Track is a 2021 American documentary film made for Netflix and directed by Tone Grøttjord-Glenne and Corinne van der Borch. It's story follows sisters and track and field athletes Tai, Rainn, and Brooke Sheppard as they navigate the obstacles of living in a homeless shelter with their single mother. The film was released on June 24, 2021.

References

External links 
 
 

2021 films
2021 documentary films
American track and field films
American sports documentary films
Documentary films about sportspeople
Documentary films about homelessness in the United States
Documentary films about poverty in the United States
Documentary films about high school in the United States
2020s English-language films
2020s American films